Rosemary Odinga (born August 13, 1977) is an entrepreneur, an advocate for alternative agriculture and proponent of social equality from Kenya. She is known for being a snail farmer.

Personal life 
Odinga was born August 13, 1977 and is the second child of Raila Odinga, a Kenyan politician.

References

External links 
 

Kenyan businesspeople
Kenyan Luo people
1977 births
Living people